José Inácio Candido de Loyola, popularly known as Fanchu Loyola (born Orlim, Salcete, Goa, 11 March 1891, died Portugal 1973), was, in the words of Charles Borges, "Goa’s foremost nationalist". He is noted for his journalism and political activism in support of human rights and democracy, humanism, anti-colonialism, and Goan independence.

Biography
Born in the home of his maternal grandparents, he was the son of Avertano Loyola and Maria Angelica Conceicão Gomes, who were prominent in the Partido Indiano, a political party associated with the Chardó caste. His uncle José Inácio de Loyola was a lawyer, owner of A Índia Portuguesa (itself the paper of the Partido Indiano), and a fierce critic of Portuguese colonialism in India. At the time of Fanchu Loyola's birth both his father and uncle were in exile in British India, not returning to Goa until September 1891. In 1917 Fanchu Loyola married Amy Amelia D'Souza, daughter of Thomas D'Souza and herself highly educated; they had three girls and a boy.

Fanchu Loyola edited and founded various newspapers, among them the Jornal da India, though these tended to be suppressed by the government. When the Jornal da India, for example, was suspended in 1913 by then Governor-General of Portuguese India, Francisco Manuel Couceiro da Costa, Loyola published an open letter to the Governor-General criticising the inhibition of his freedom of speech entitled Cara Politíca and proceeded to found the new Rebate. In 1926, Loyola was the strategist behind the election of Prazeres da Costa to the Superior Council of Colonies. Among his writings and speeches, he became particularly noted for his speech "Basta" ("enough is enough"), a pro-democracy and anti-colonial speech given on 25 November 1932. In the 1930s, Loyola moved to Bombay, where he edited Portugal e Colonias. While inspector of village communities, in 1927, he undertook agricultural experiments in Carambolim, and wrote extensively on the possibilities for Goa's economic development.

On 11 October 1946 was arrested, sentenced to four years' imprisonment and the removal of his political rights for fifteen years, and deported to Peniche Fortress until his early and conditional release on 12 January 1947. He remained in Portugal until 1958, but after Goa's conquest by India returned to Portugal: "Disillusioned and too old to take up the fight, he returned to Lisbon to live in isolation and mourn the loss of his beloved Goa". He died in Portugal in 1973.

Writings

Many of Loyala's writings are available in English translation:
 Goa’s Foremost Nationalist José Inácio Candido de Loyola: The Man and his Writings, ed. by Charles Borges, trans. by Lino Leitão (New Delhi: Concept Publishing, 2000)
 José Inácio Candido de Loyola, Passionate and Unrestrained, trans. by Alexandre Moniz Barbosa (Panjim: Broadway Book Centre, 2008)

References

1891 births
1973 deaths
20th-century Indian journalists
Journalists from Goa
People from South Goa district
Portuguese people of Goan descent
Indian Roman Catholics
Portuguese Roman Catholics
20th-century Portuguese writers
Portuguese male writers
Portuguese-language writers
Goa liberation activists
Colonial Goa
Goan Catholics
20th-century Indian male writers